In electrochemistry, the Anson equation defines the charge-time dependence for linear diffusion control in chronocoulometry.

The Anson equation is written as:

where,
Q = charge in coulombs
n = number of electrons (to reduce/oxidize one molecule of analyte)
F = Faraday constant, 96485 C/mol
A = area of the (planar) electrode in cm2
C = concentration in mol/cm3;
D = diffusion coefficient in cm2/s
t = time in s.

See also 
 Voltammetry
 Electroanalytical methods
 Limiting current
 Cottrell equation

References

Electrochemical equations